Manolis Papadopoulos (born 22 April 1968) is a Greek professional footballer who played as a defender and a manager.

Club career
Papadopoulos started his career in 1988 at Ionikos, where he was transferred to AEK Athens, in the summer of 1992, while before that he had also been from Olympiakos. He used in AEK most of the time as a substitute also having a few appearances as a starter, especially when Dušan Bajević used formation with 3 stoppers. In the matches against Rangers for the UEFA Champions League qualifiers in the summer of 1994, when he was assigned to mark Mark Hateley, managing to contain him.
During his spell with the "double-headed eagle" Papadopoulos won 2 consecutive championships. In the summer of 1995 he moved to Apollon Athens for two season and then to Ethnikos Piraeus for another two. In 1999 he signed for PAS Giannina, for a while and then moved to Kozani. where he played until 2001. The following season he moved to Chaidari, where he played for one season before ending his career as a footballer.

International career
Papadopoulos played once for Greece in 1992.

Managerial career
Papadopoulos started his coaching career in 2002, during of which he sat on the benches of various teams, such as Kerkyra, Pamisos Messini, AE Giannena and Lamia. In the summer of 2011, he was hired as the coach of the youth team of AEK Athens, while at the beginning of the following season he assumed the role of assistant to the coach of the first team, Vangelis Vlachos. The club were going through the worst season in their history after Vlachos was sacked he was  the first coach for a match at home against Kerkyra, which ended 1–1. Afterwards, Ewald Lienen was hired and Papadopoulos continued to his duties as an assistant coach with the German technician until the end of the season. After AEK, he sat on the bench of Proodeftiki for a few days and then at Egaleo, while in 2015 was at APO Kanaris Nenita for a season.

Personal life
Papadopoulos has a strong participation in the association of veteran football players of AEK to this day.

Honours

AEK Athens
Alpha Ethniki: 1992–93, 1993–94

References

1968 births
Living people
Greek footballers
Olympiacos F.C. players
Ionikos F.C. players
AEK Athens F.C. players
Apollon Smyrnis F.C. players
Ethnikos Piraeus F.C. players
PAS Giannina F.C. players
Kozani F.C. players
Chaidari F.C. players
Greece international footballers
Association football defenders
Super League Greece players
Greek football managers
A.O. Kerkyra managers
PAS Lamia 1964 managers
AEK Athens F.C. non-playing staff
Proodeftiki F.C. managers
Egaleo F.C. managers
Footballers from Livadeia